Beaulieu is a commune in the Nièvre department in central France. On 1 January 2016, the former communes Dompierre-sur-Héry and Michaugues were merged into Beaulieu.

Population

See also
Communes of the Nièvre department

References

Communes of Nièvre